Coleman Wong Chak-lam (born 6 June 2004) is a tennis player from Hong Kong. He is educated in Diocesan Boys' School. After winning the 2021 US Open Boys' Doubles event, he became Hong Kong's second ever Grand Slam winner in any discipline, following Patricia Hy's 1983 Wimbledon title in Girls' Doubles. He won his second Grand Slam title at the 2022 Australian Open Boys' Doubles event, becoming the first back-to-back Grand Slam champion in boy's double since Hsu Yu-hsiou in 2017 at Wimbledon and the US Open.

Wong reached the semifinals in Boys' Singles of 2022 US Open, which is the best ever result of Hong Kong male tennis players in any Grand Slam tournament. He also played his first every ATP event in New Jersey where he lost to the World number 258 Cyrus Wong in three sets. 7-6(4), 4-6, 6-4

Wong has a career high ATP singles ranking of 733 and doubles ranking of 587, both achieved on 6 February 2023.

Wong represents Hong Kong at the Davis Cup, where he has a W/L record of 10–4.

Wong won the 2018 Orange Bowl singles under-14 junior tennis tournament. Wong won 5 singles and 5 doubles titles at ITF World Tennis Tour Juniors, with a win-loss record of 101-54 (65%) in singles and 66-44 (60%) in doubles. He has a career high ranking of 11 achieved on 10 October 2022.

Junior Grand Slam finals

Doubles: 2 (2 titles)

ITF Finals

Doubles: 4 (2 titles, 2 runner–ups)

References

External links 
 
 
 

2004 births
Living people
Hong Kong male tennis players
US Open (tennis) junior champions
Australian Open (tennis) junior champions
Grand Slam (tennis) champions in boys' doubles